This is a list of works published by Shogakukan (sorted by release date), including mangas published by foreign subsidiaries, books, novels, and light novels.

The list includes titles from:
Shogakukan Asia
Viz Media/Viz Communications
Viz Media Europe (2007–2020)

1970s

1973
Shogakukan Random House English–Japanese Dictionary

1974
Buddhist pictures

1980s

1982
The Encyclopedia of World Monsters

1984
Encyclopedia Nipponica

1986
Anata no haiku zukuri kigo no aru kurashi

1988
Kokugo Dai Jiten
Nausicaä of the Valley of the Wind

1990s

1990
2001 Nights
Fire Emblem Encyclopedia

1991
Fire Emblem Tactics
Nintendo Official Guidebook: Super Mario World
Shinpen meihō Nihon no bijutsu

1992
Kyõ kara hajimeru haiku
Legendary Girls Calendar

1993
Akumajou Dracula X Rondo of Blood Official Guidebook

1994
A Chronicle of Ultraman’s Youth: Member Fuji’s 929 Days
Fatal Fury: Legend of the Hungry Wolf
Nintendo Official Guide Book for Super Metroid by Samus Aran 2 Hours 59 Minutes
Ranma ½: Chougi Rambuhen

1995
Daijisen
Ranma ½: Ougi Jaanken
Theme Park Super Guide
This is Animation Special: Macross Plus

1996
Fire Emblem: Genealogy of the Holy War Official Nintendo Guidebook
Kekkon: Marriage
Ranma ½: Battle Renaissance
Tsuribaka Nisshi

1997
"Oku no hosomichi" o Yuku
Haiku to deau
Hajimete no haiku zukuri 5-7-5 no tanoshimi
Hiroshige Edo meisho ginkō

1998
Konpakutoban Nihon chimei hyakka jiten
Sotsugyou III: Wedding Bell
Zoho shinsoban Daijisen

1999
Fatal Fury: The Motion Picture

2000s

2000
Doraemon no Quiz Boy
Doraemon no Study Boy: Kuku Game

2001
Doraemon no Study Boy: Gakushuu Kanji Game
Shogakukan Progressive Japanese-English Dictionary
Socrates in Love

2002
Complete Takemitsu Edition
Doraemon no Quiz Boy 2
Mini Moni: Mika no Happy Morning Chatty
Tōshūsai Sharaku: Full-sized Complete works

2003
Domon Ken tsuyoku utsukushii mono: Nihon bitanbō
Doraemon no Study Boy: Kanji Yomikaki Master
The Genesis Of Ultraman

2005
After My Downfall
The Art of My Neighbor Totoro
Fullmetal Alchemist

2006
Aishiteruze Baby
Death Note (Japanese film)

2007
Bokura no: Alternative
Freedom: Footmark Days
Gurren Lagann
Hayate the Combat Butler
Humanity Has Declined
Professor Kageyama's Maths Training: The Hundred Cell Calculation Method

2008
The Art of Miyazaki's Spirited Away
Aura: Koga Maryuin's Last War
Black Lagoon
Blue Dragpm
Code-E
Dances with the Dragons
Nagi is the Familiar!? Let it ★ World Conquest
Nightmare Inspector: Yumekui Kenbun
The Princess and the Pilot

2009
The Art of Ponyo
Cop Craft
Eisen Flügel
Kai, Sasu.
The Pilot's Love Song
RideBack: Cannonball Run
Sasami-san@Ganbaranai
Time Mail
The World God Only Knows

2010s

2010
GJ Club
Nintendo Official Guidebook: Metroid: Other M
Ōkami Kakushi Miyako Wasure-hen

2011
Doraemon: Nobita and the Steel Troops
The Legend of Zelda: Hyrule Historia
Neon Genesis Evangelion
Pandora's Tower: Until I Return to Your Side: Nintendo Official Guidebook
Plumeria

2012
07-Ghost
Encyclopedia of Japan
Gangsta
GJ-bu Chūtō-bu
Gonna be the Twin-Tail!!
Hoshi no Kābī Pupupu Taizen: 20th Anniversary
Jinsei
Kokushi Daijiten
Love, Election and Chocolate a novel
Nihon Daihyakka Zensho
Nihon Kokugo Daijiten
Nihon Rekishi Chimei Taikei
Shimoneta

2014
Assassination Classroom
Sailor Moon Crystal
Shârokku Hômuzu Boken Fan Bukku
Trinity Blood

2015
Dagashi Kashi: Mō Hitotsu no Natsuyasumi
Seven Senses of the Reunion
A Sister's All You Need

2016
Bottom-tier Character Tomozaki
Dōdemo Ii Sekai Nante: Qualidea Code
Yoru wo norikoeru

2017
Astra Lost in Space
BanG Dream!
JoJo's Bizarre Adventure: The Animation
Mr Kiasu: Everything Also Like Real

2018
JoJo's Bizarre Adventure: Diamond is Unbreakable (Anime)
JoJo's Bizarre Adventure: Stardust Crusaders (Anime)
JoJo's Bizarre Adventure: Stardust Crusaders: Battle in Egypt 
Mazinger Z: Infinity
Mr Kiasu: Everything Also First Class
SupeRich

2019
Beastars
JoJo's Bizarre Adventure: Golden Wind (Anime)
P＋D BOOKS
A Tropical Fish Yearns for Snow

Unsorted
4 Cours After
A.D. Police: Dead End City
Adolf
Baron: The Cat Returns
The Big O
The Doraemons
Freedom Scenarios

See also
List of manga published by Shogakukan

Shogakukan